The Admiral Vernon is a Grade II listed pub in Dagenham, London.

The Admiral Vernon was added to the National Heritage List for England in June 2022.

It was built in the 1930s, and has "kept a good deal of its original plan, fittings and character."

References

External links

Grade II listed pubs in London
Pubs in the London Borough of Barking and Dagenham
Grade II listed buildings in the London Borough of Barking and Dagenham